The Province of South Sardinia is an Italian province of Sardinia instituted on 4 February 2016. It includes the suppressed provinces of Carbonia-Iglesias and Medio Campidano, a large part of the old Province of Cagliari (without the 17 municipalities of the new Metropolitan City), and two other municipalities.

History
South Sardinia was instituted as a result of the law reforming provinces in Sardinia (Regional Law 2/2016). Once operational, it will include most of the geographic region of Campidano, the Sarrabus-Gerrei, the Trexenta and the Sulcis-Iglesiente. The provincial capital will be determined by the first provincial council, as well as the institution's statute.

Geography

Municipalities
From the Province of Carbonia-Iglesias (all 23): Buggerru, Calasetta, Carbonia, Carloforte, Domusnovas, Fluminimaggiore, Giba, Gonnesa, Iglesias, Masainas, Musei, Narcao, Nuxis, Perdaxius, Piscinas, Portoscuso, San Giovanni Suergiu, Sant'Anna Arresi, Sant'Antioco, Santadi, Tratalias, Villamassargia, Villaperuccio
From the Province of Medio Campidano (all 28): Arbus, Barumini, Collinas, Furtei, Genuri, Gesturi, Gonnosfanadiga, Guspini, Las Plassas, Lunamatrona, Pabillonis, Pauli Arbarei, Samassi, San Gavino Monreale, Sanluri, Sardara, Segariu, Serramanna, Serrenti, Setzu, Siddi, Tuili, Turri, Ussaramanna, Villacidro, Villamar, Villanovaforru, Villanovafranca
From the Province of Cagliari (54 of 71): Armungia, Ballao, Barrali, Burcei, Castiadas, Decimoputzu, Dolianova, Domus de Maria, Donori, Escalaplano, Escolca, Esterzili, Gergei, Gesico, Goni, Guamaggiore, Guasila, Isili, Mandas, Monastir, Muravera, Nuragus, Nurallao, Nuraminis, Nurri, Orroli, Ortacesus, Pimentel, Sadali, Samatzai, San Basilio, San Nicolò Gerrei, San Sperate, San Vito, Sant'Andrea Frius, Selegas, Senorbì, Serdiana, Serri, Seulo, Siliqua, Silius, Siurgus Donigala, Soleminis, Suelli, Teulada, Ussana, Vallermosa, Villanova Tulo, Villaputzu, Villasalto, Villasimius, Villasor, Villaspeciosa
From the Province of Ogliastra: Seui
From the Province of Oristano: Genoni

Government

List of presidents of the province of South Sardinia

References

 

 
South Sardinia
South Sardinia
South Sardinia